Bilocate is a dark Oriental metal band from Amman, Jordan, founded in 2002 by Ramzi Essayed, Waseem Essayed and Hani Al Abbadi. The band's style combines doom metal, death metal and black metal with Oriental elements.

History
The band was founded by the brothers Ramzi and Waseem Essayed and their friend Hani Al Abadi, and got started when they were joined by guitarist Baha' Farah, and later by guitarist Rami Haikal. Their first full-length album, Dysphoria, was released in the winter of 2005, and received significant airplay on the local governmental radio station Jordan FM, with a 5-hour show being dedicated to the band and the album on October 27. They released a music video for "2nd War in Heaven." A second video, for "Days of Joy," was produced by Jacknife Video Productions. Bilocate added a new drummer, Ahmad Kloob, in late 2006, and started preparing for a new album.

In July 2008, Sudden Death Syndrome was released, mixed and mastered by Jens Bogren (Opeth, Bloodbath, Katatonia, Paradise Lost, and others). The album received positive reviews from magazines and websites such as  Decibel and Blabbermouth.net. The album was self-released and is now distributed in the United States via The Omega Order, the distribution arm of The End Records. In December 2008, Terrorizer reviewed Sudden Death Syndrome, calling it "a tasteful and sophisticated piece of work that determinedly puts the Jordanian metal scene on the map." The album has led to extensive coverage for the band in the West in the heavy metal media online as well as in print, such as interviews with Terrorizer  and Metal Hammer; the latter praised their "rich, doomy sound" and called Sudden Death Syndrome a "stunning, heartfelt metal album." Metal Storm nominated the album for its Best Doom Metal Album Award; Bilocate's album finished in sixth place (of ten).

Heavy metal music is still controversial in Jordan, as suggested in a brief interview with Terrorizer, December 2008, in which Rami Haikal said, "We have even been told to dissolve the band and to stop publishing our music by any means." In an interview with Metal Hammer, Waseem Essayed said, "We are facing a lot of pressure and a huge rejection from security, religious authorities, and the community." The UAE newspaper The National reported in October 2008, in a series of articles called "Young in the Muslim World," that a Bilocate concert in Jordan was canceled by authorities, "citing unspecified 'security reasons.'"

Band members

Current members
Ramzi Essayed - vocals (2003–present)
Hani Al Abadi - bass (2003–present)
Waseem Essayed - keyboards
Baha Farah - guitars (lead) (2003–present)
Rami Haikal - guitars (rhythm) (2003–present)
Ahmed Kloub - drums (2006–present)

Past members
Ibrahim Al Qaisi - drums (2006)

Session members
Ala' Faraj - guitars (2008–present)

Discography

Albums
 Dysphoria (2005)
 Sudden Death Syndrome (2008)
 Summoning the Bygones (2012)

EP's, Demos and Singles
 Dysphoria (Demo, 2003)

References

Doom metal musical groups
Death metal musical groups
Musical groups established in 2002
Jordanian heavy metal musical groups
2002 establishments in Jordan